"Hurdy Gurdy Man" is a 1968 song by the Scottish singer-songwriter Donovan.

"Hurdy Gurdy Man" or "The Hurdy Gurdy Man" may also refer to:
 A man who plays the hurdy-gurdy
 "Der Leiermann" ("The Hurdy Gurdy Man"), from the song cycle Winterreise by Franz Schubert, 1827
 "Hurdy Gurdy Man" (The Spectres song), 1966
 The Hurdy Gurdy Man, an album by Donovan, 1968
 The Hurdy Gurdy Man, the autobiography of Donovan, 2005
 The Hurdy Gurdy Man (EP), by the Butthole Surfers, 1990

See also
 Hurdy-gurdy (disambiguation)